Yvonne Köstenberger (born 6 September 1972) is a Swiss diver. She competed in the women's 10 metre platform event at the 1992 Summer Olympics.

References

External links
 

1972 births
Living people
Swiss female divers
Olympic divers of Switzerland
Divers at the 1992 Summer Olympics
Place of birth missing (living people)